The Gbaya, also Gbeya or Baya, are a people of western region of Central African Republic, east-central Cameroon, the north of the Republic of Congo, and the northwest of the Democratic Republic of Congo. In the first half of the 20th century, the Gbaya were involved in several revolt attempts against German and then French colonial rule.

In rural areas, the Gbaya cultivate mainly maize, cassava, yams, peanuts, tobacco, coffee and rice, the latter two of which were introduced by the French. Today, many of the Gbaya people are Christians, though witchcraft is practiced, known as dua.

History

Gbaya people have been present in Central Africa since at least the 16th century. Archaeological researches have determined their place of origin to be located somewhere in the lower valley of the Lobaye River. During the early 19th century, several Gbaya tribes migrated toward the Eastern area of whats is now Cameroon.

During the 19th century, a series of wars opposed Gbaya tribes to Fulani tribes of the Sokoto Caliphate. These wars were marked by extensive slave raiding, resulting in the enslavement of a great numbers of Gbaya by the Fulani.

The first contact with Europeans occurred in 1892, when French explorer Antoine Mizon entered Gbaya territory after steaming up the Sangha River.

In the early 1900s, the area where the Gbaya lived became part of German Kamerun. The Gbaya, who traditionally lived in small rural communities, strongly resented the forced urbanization brought by the Germans. Many tribes initially responded by moving away to remote areas, but a German repression campaign soon forced them back into submission. By 1910, all the resisting tribes had been subdued, and their leaders had been hanged. From 1912 onward, many Gbaya tribes were forced to collect rubber for the Germans.

When the First World War broke out, France, Britain and Belgium invaded German Kamerun. Many Gbaya joined the French to get revenge from the oppression they had suffered at the hands of the Germans.
As they retreated, German forces used scorched earth tactics, burning down many Gbaya villages 
The Gbaya also suffered greatly when a number of Congolese Force Publique troops went rogue and indulged in a serie of rapes and murders on the locals. To escape the horrors of the war, many Gbaya tribes went to live deep into the rainforest, and soon the old practices that the German administration had attempted to quell, such as tribal wars, slavery and cannibalism, became popular again.

In 1928, forced labor conscription by the French to build the Congo-Ocean Railway, and the rise of Karnu, a Gbaya prophet who claimed to possess magical powers that could defeat the French, caused the Gbaya to revolt massively. Karnu was killed early, but revolt kept raging for about three years until the French were finally able to put it down.

The Gbaya people felt discriminated against in the political sphere, even after independence from the French. It was only in the 1990s that a notable number of Gbaya leaders began to be admitted into higher administrative positions in government. More recent estimates of the population differ markedly, from 1.2 million, down to 685,100, of which 358,000 are native to Cameroon.

Sub groups and languages
Subgroups of the Gbaya include the Bokoto, Kara, Kaka, Buli, and Bwaka. The Gbaya speak a language of the Adamawa-Ubangi subgroup of the Niger-Congo language family.

Cannibalism
Pre-colonial and early colonial era Gbaya tribes routineley indulged in ritual anthropophagy. While it essentially targeted defeated enemies, it could in some occasions be extended to owned slaves. This behavior deeply disgusted the Germans and the French, causing them to disdain and mistreat the Gbaya people, and to favor other ethnicities (such as the Fulani) over the Gbaya.

By the end of the 20th century, anthropophagy is considered to have completely disappeared from Gbaya culture. One of the last recorded cases occurred in 1949, when a dozen old Gbaya men from a village near Bertoua were arrested after having indulged in ritual cannibalism.

Economic and cultural practices

In rural areas, the Gbaya cultivate mainly maize, cassava (staple food), yams, peanuts, tobacco, coffee and rice, the latter two of which were introduced by the French. The diamond industry took off in the late 1930s and still remains important. The agriculture method of Gbaya is called "swidden", a type of "slash and burn" farming where the forest is cleared, vegetation burnt on top of the cleared land, the farm used for a few years, then abandoned and the families move to a new area.

The Gbaya make an alcoholic beverage prepared with honey which is known as kuri. Kam, is a Gbaya porridge made from cassava. Today, most of the Gbaya people are Christians (50% Protestant, 33% Catholic), about 12% follows original indigenous beliefs, with only a minority of Muslims (3%). Witchcraft is known to be practiced, and is known to the people as dua.

Stories and rituals of the Gbaya people are a feature of everyday society. The rituals employ martial arts equipment such as two edged swords and throwing knives.

See also
Gbaya languages
To language

References

Ethnic groups in Cameroon
Ethnic groups in the Central African Republic
Ethnic groups in the Republic of the Congo
Ethnic groups in the Democratic Republic of the Congo